WCGO (1590 AM) is a radio station broadcasting a talk format, with Korean Christian programming weekday mornings. Licensed to Evanston, Illinois, United States, it serves the Chicago area.  The station is currently owned by William Pollack's Pollack Broadcasting, through licensee Evanston Broadcasting LLC. It is also heard locally in Evanston and nearby neighborhoods of Chicago through a translator at 95.9 FM.

1590 AM is a Regional broadcast frequency.  There are no stations in Hawaii, Alaska or Canada on 1590 AM, and there is only one in Mexico.

History

WNMP
The station began broadcasting on September 29, 1947, and held the call sign WNMP. WNMP operated during daytime hours only, with a power of 1,000 watts. Block programming was aired in its early years. In 1959, the station adopted a classical music/light music format. In 1960, the station was sold to Harry H. Semrow and his brother Otto Semrow for $325,000. The station aired an easy listening format in the 1960s and carried Northwestern Wildcats football. In December 1969, the station was sold to Alan H. Cummings and Buddy Black for $875,000.

WLTD
Its call sign was changed to WLTD on November 2, 1970. WLTD aired easy listening music, old-time radio shows, and specialty talk shows. On May 2, 1970, Chuck Schaden's first Those Were The Days program aired on WNMP. It continued on WLTD until 1975, when the station changed format.

In 1975, the station was sold to Kovas Communications for $400,000, and adopted a beautiful music format.

WONX
On April 9, 1979, the station's call sign was changed to WONX. The station switched to a Spanish language format. Programming in other languages were also aired over the years. In 1982, the station added nighttime operations, running 2,500 watts. It used a four-tower directional array at night. In 1997, the station's daytime power was increased to 3,500 watts.

WCGO

On April 10, 2009, the previous WCGO on 1600, also owned by Kovas, was taken off the air. On April 13, 2009, WONX's call sign was changed to WCGO. With 1600 now vacant, the new WCGO was able to increase its daytime power to 7,000 watts. In 2014, the station's daytime power was increased to 10,000 watts.

WCGO began airing talk programs in September 2014, with local shows hosted by Franklin Raff and Geoff Pinkus, as well as Dana Loesch's syndicated program. On April 6, 2015, Milt Rosenberg began hosting a program on the station. As of 2023, its programming is multilingual: Weekend programming includes Legal Eagles with William Pelarenos, The Dave Ramsey Show, The Assyrian Cultural Foundation: The Guiding Voice with Ninos Nirari, The Chicago Wine Report with Chip Dudley, Tom Hall, and Lainie Petersen, Domingo Felices with  Frank Camacho, and Dialogo Politico with Robert Ameneiro. Weekdays features Korean Christian programming weekday mornings, Russian language programing via Radio NVC weekday afternoons, and Multiformat Network show highlights in the evenings. Overnight programming is Coast to Coast AM  and Coast to Coast Weekends with George Noory.

In 2017, the station was sold to William Pollack for $3 million. In 2019, WCGO became the flagship station of the national SmartTalk Radio Network.

References

External links

CGO
Talk radio stations in the United States
Korean-language radio stations in the United States
Evanston, Illinois
Radio stations established in 1947
1947 establishments in Illinois